Sri Bhagawan Mahaveer Jain College (SBMJC) was established in the year 1990. Founded by Group of members of Jain Society, in VV Puram and now known as a part of Jain University which has established many colleges. However, SBMJC remains a prominent college. The college has 5 campuses spread over Bangalore and 1 campus in KGF. The college is home to more than 8,000 students.

External links
Official website

Pre University colleges in Karnataka
Colleges in Bangalore
Educational institutions established in 1990
1990 establishments in Karnataka